The  was a cabinet-level ministry in the government of the Empire of Japan from 1942 to 1945, established to administer overseas territories obtained by Japan in the Pacific War and to coordinate the establishment and development of the Greater East Asia Co-Prosperity Sphere.

History and development

Theoretically, the ministry had political and administrative responsibilities in a vast  area under Japanese influence (extending south  from the Aleutians to the Solomon Islands, and west  from Wake Island to Burma and the Andamans), with perhaps a population of over 300 million inhabitants. In reality, wartime conditions meant that the ministry was little more than a paper creation. Aside from the first Minister of Greater East Asia, Kazuo Aoki, all succeeding ministers simultaneously held the portfolio of the Foreign Minister.

The Ministry of Greater East Asia was abolished on 26 August 1945 by order of the Supreme Commander for the Allied Powers after the surrender of Japan brought an end to Japan's overseas holdings.

List of Ministers of Greater East Asia

See also
Greater East Asia Conference
Greater East Asia Co-Prosperity Sphere
Japanese colonial empire
List of territories occupied by Imperial Japan

References

External links
WW2DB: Greater East Asia Conference
"Foreign Office Files for Japan and the Far East". Adam Matthew Publications. Accessed 2 March 2005.

Foreign relations of the Empire of Japan
Greater East Asia
Japanese military occupations
Politics of the Empire of Japan
1942 establishments in Japan
1945 disestablishments in Japan
Japanese colonial empire